Byron Sylvester Waite (September 27, 1852 – December 31, 1930) was an Associate Justice of the United States Customs Court and previously was a Member of the Board of General Appraisers.

Education and career

Born on September 27, 1852, in Penfield, New York, Waite received a Bachelor of Arts degree in 1880 from the University of Michigan and read law. He entered private practice in Wayne County, Michigan from 1881 to 1889. He served as a member of the Michigan House of Representatives from 1889 to 1890 and again from 1895 to 1896. He served as assistant prosecuting attorney for Wayne County from 1895 to 1898. He served as a Judge for the Third Judicial Circuit of Michigan from 1898 to 1900.

Federal Judicial Service

Waite was nominated by President Theodore Roosevelt on June 13, 1902, to a seat on the Board of General Appraisers vacated by Member Charles H. Ham. He was confirmed by the United States Senate on June 19, 1902, and received his commission on June 25, 1902. Waite was reassigned by operation of law to the United States Customs Court on May 28, 1926, to a new Associate Justice seat authorized by 44 Stat. 669. His service terminated on November 1, 1930, due to his retirement. He was succeeded by Associate Justice Walter Howard Evans.

Incident

Two days after his retirement, the New York Supreme Court ruled against his former daughter in law (Olive Celeste Moore-White-Waite-Matthews) and American Express for receiving a shipment of rugs and carpets (August 1919) from the United States Customs House without ever meeting the terms of the bill of lading.

Death

Waite died on December 31, 1930, in Yonkers, New York.

References

Sources
 

1852 births
1930 deaths
Judges of the United States Customs Court
People from Penfield, New York
Members of the Board of General Appraisers
Members of the Michigan House of Representatives
Michigan state court judges
United States Article I federal judges appointed by Theodore Roosevelt
20th-century American judges
University of Michigan Law School alumni
United States federal judges admitted to the practice of law by reading law